Stella Elfriede Staudinger (born October 26, 1972) is a former Austrian female professional basketball player.

References

External links
Profile at fibaeurope.com
Profile at eurobasket.com

1972 births
Living people
People from Steyr
Austrian women's basketball players
Point guards
Sportspeople from Upper Austria